The small-scaled skink (Oligosoma microlepis) is a species of skink in the family Scincidae. The first specimen was captured in 1971 on Motutaiko Island, Lake Taupō but it is now known to be endemic to the central North Island of New Zealand in small population pockets. The holotype is in the collection of the Museum of New Zealand Te Papa Tongarewa.

Conservation status 

As of 2012 the Department of Conservation (DOC) classified the small-scaled skink as "Nationally Vulnerable" under the New Zealand Threat Classification System.

References

Oligosoma
Reptiles of New Zealand
Reptiles described in 1990
Taxa named by Geoff B. Patterson
Taxa named by Charles H. Daugherty
Taxonomy articles created by Polbot